The New York Hotel in Salt Lake City, Utah, at 42 Post Office Pl., was built in 1906.  It was listed on the National Register of Historic Places in 1980.

It was a work of leading Salt Lake City architect Richard K.A. Kletting.

It is a three-story brick building designed to have shops on the ground floor and 62 hotel rooms above.  Some hotel room suites had bathrooms; there were also single rooms served by a bathroom on each floor.  It was "completely modern" in 1906, having both steam heat and electric lights. 

It was built as a luxury hotel for Orange J. Salisbury, a mining engineer and businessman who obtained patents and started the United Filter Corporation.

References

External links

Hotels in Utah
National Register of Historic Places in Salt Lake City
Buildings and structures completed in 1906
1906 establishments in Utah